Terry McGroom (March 16, 1966 – April 17, 2016) was an American professional boxer who competed from 1993 to 2004. He challenged for the IBF cruiserweight title in 2001.

Early life
McGroom attended Wells High School in Chicago, which was "full of gangbangers." Tom O'Shea, an English teacher at the school, said he was "an arrogant, nasty kid who was always in trouble with his teachers," apart from the fact that he did not earn a single credit in his freshman year. When O'Shea caught McGroom fighting in the hallways, he was given a choice: follow him to the principal's office or to the boxing gym. O'Shea became his coach, a position he held throughout McGroom's amateur career.

He later graduated from Wells as an honor student, earning a boxing scholarship to Northern Michigan University.

Amateur career
McGroom had a stellar amateur career prior to turning professional, going 63-11. He was a National Golden Gloves Light Heavyweight champion in 1987, 1988, 1989, and 1992 and a National Amateur Light Heavyweight Champion in 1991. McGroom also won a silver medal from the 1990 Goodwill Games in the 81 kg division.

He also competed at the 1989 World Championships in Moscow.

Professional career
McGroom turned pro in 1993 and started off his career going undefeated in his first 11 fights. He then faced Darrol Wilson, a heavy hitting heavyweight who would make a name for himself later on, in 1995, and battled his way to a 10-round draw. McGroom's next big fight was an 8th-round TKO loss to future contender Kirk Johnson. Johnson was much bigger than McGroom and slugged him to the canvas.

After the loss to Johnson, McGroom's impressive victory over Esteban Pizzarro in 1999 earned him the biggest fight of his career against James Toney in 2000. It was a close fight with Toney and some thought the decision should have been given to McGroom. In 2001 he challenged Vasily Jirov for his IBF Cruiserweight belt. The result was a shocking one-round KO for Jirov, the result from one well place body shot.

McGroom then moved up to Heavyweight and had little success. He lost to future contenders Dominick Guinn, Malik Scott, and Timor Ibragimov before retiring in 2004.

Personal life
McGroom died from bone cancer on April 17, 2016.

Professional boxing record

|-
|align="center" colspan=8|19 Wins (10 knockouts, 9 decisions), 9 Losses (4 knockouts, 5 decisions), 3 Draws 
|-
| align="center" style="border-style: none none solid solid; background: #e3e3e3"|Result
| align="center" style="border-style: none none solid solid; background: #e3e3e3"|Record
| align="center" style="border-style: none none solid solid; background: #e3e3e3"|Opponent
| align="center" style="border-style: none none solid solid; background: #e3e3e3"|Type
| align="center" style="border-style: none none solid solid; background: #e3e3e3"|Round
| align="center" style="border-style: none none solid solid; background: #e3e3e3"|Date
| align="center" style="border-style: none none solid solid; background: #e3e3e3"|Location
| align="center" style="border-style: none none solid solid; background: #e3e3e3"|Notes
|-align=center
|Loss
|19–9–3
|align=left| Cengiz Koc
|UD
|6
|24/07/2004
|align=left| Frankfurt, Germany
|align=left|
|-
|Loss
|19–8–3
|align=left| Timur Ibragimov
|UD
|8
|22/04/2004
|align=left| Moscow, Russia
|align=left|
|-
|Loss
|19–7–3
|align=left| Johny Jensen
|SD
|6
|28/02/2004
|align=left| Aalborg, Denmark
|align=left|
|-
| Draw
|19–6–3
|align=left| Johny Jensen
|PTS
|6
|24/10/2003
|align=left| Copenhagen, Denmark
|align=left|
|-
|Loss
|19–6–2
|align=left| Steve Cunningham
|UD
|8
|20/09/2003
|align=left| Uncasville, Connecticut, U.S.
|align=left|
|-
|Loss
|19–5–2
|align=left| Malik Scott
|TKO
|2
|01/02/2003
|align=left| Uncasville, Connecticut, U.S.
|align=left|
|-
|Loss
|19–4–2
|align=left| Dominick Guinn
|TKO
|7
|08/09/2002
|align=left| Lawton, Oklahoma, U.S.
|align=left|
|-
|Loss
|19–3–2
|align=left| Vassiliy Jirov
|KO
|1
|24/03/2001
|align=left| Las Vegas, Nevada, U.S.
|align=left|
|-
|Win
|19–2–2
|align=left| Ed Strickland
|KO
|1
|21/02/2001
|align=left| Indianapolis, Indiana, U.S.
|align=left|
|-
|Loss
|18–2–2
|align=left| James Toney
|MD
|10
|21/01/2000
|align=left| Chicago, Illinois, U.S.
|align=left|
|-
|Win
|18–1–2
|align=left| Esteban Pizzarro
|UD
|12
|26/06/1999
|align=left| Cicero, Illinois, U.S.
|align=left|
|-
|Win
|17–1–2
|align=left| Jesse Corona
|UD
|10
|05/03/1999
|align=left| Chicago, Illinois, U.S.
|align=left|
|-
|Win
|16–1–2
|align=left| Vinson Durham
|UD
|10
|29/01/1999
|align=left| Chicago, Illinois, U.S.
|align=left|
|-
|Win
|15–1–2
|align=left| Mike Acklie
|TKO
|2
|13/11/1998
|align=left| Chicago, Illinois, U.S.
|align=left|
|-
|Win
|14–1–2
|align=left| Brian Yates
|UD
|6
|01/10/1997
|align=left| Chicago, Illinois, U.S.
|align=left|
|-
|Loss
|13–1–2
|align=left| Kirk Johnson
|TKO
|8
|16/11/1996
|align=left| Atlantic City, New Jersey, U.S.
|align=left|
|-
| Draw
|13–0–2
|align=left| Anthony Hembrick
|PTS
|10
|23/04/1996
|align=left| Auburn Hills, Michigan, U.S.
|align=left|
|-
|Win
|13–0–1
|align=left| Arthur Saribekian
|UD
|8
|21/11/1995
|align=left| Auburn Hills, Michigan, U.S.
|align=left|
|-
|Win
|12–0–1
|align=left| Ron Preston
|UD
|8
|03/10/1995
|align=left| Flint, Michigan, U.S.
|align=left|
|-
| Draw
|11–0–1
|align=left| Darroll Wilson
|PTS
|10
|17/08/1995
|align=left| Atlantic City, New Jersey, U.S.
|align=left|
|-
|Win
|11–0
|align=left| Exum Speight
|TKO
|2
|28/03/1995
|align=left| Flint, Michigan, U.S.
|align=left|
|-
|Win
|10–0
|align=left| Ken Jackson
|TKO
|2
|20/08/1994
|align=left| Athens, Tennessee, U.S.
|align=left|
|-
|Win
|9–0
|align=left| Randy McGee
|UD
|8
|21/05/1994
|align=left| Knoxville, Tennessee, U.S.
|align=left|
|-
|Win
|8–0
|align=left| Tim St Clair
|UD
|8
|05/02/1994
|align=left| Knoxville, Tennessee, U.S.
|align=left|
|-
|Win
|7–0
|align=left|Morris Young
|TKO
|4
|18/12/1993
|align=left| Knoxville, Tennessee, U.S.
|align=left|
|-
|Win
|6–0
|align=left| Aaron Green
|KO
|4
|13/11/1993
|align=left| Knoxville, Tennessee, U.S.
|align=left|
|-
|Win
|5–0
|align=left| Leonard Lamar Long
|PTS
|6
|28/08/1993
|align=left| Knoxville, Tennessee, U.S.
|align=left|
|-
|Win
|4–0
|align=left| Darren Jewell
|KO
|2
|17/07/1993
|align=left| Knoxville, Tennessee, U.S.
|align=left|
|-
|Win
|3–0
|align=left|Ricardo Estrada
|TKO
|3
|12/06/1993
|align=left| Knoxville, Tennessee, U.S.
|align=left|
|-
|Win
|2–0
|align=left|Donald Johnson
|TKO
|2
|27/03/1993
|align=left| Knoxville, Tennessee, U.S.
|align=left|
|-
|Win
|1–0
|align=left|William Yates
|TKO
|1
|16/01/1993
|align=left| Knoxville, Tennessee, U.S.
|align=left|
|}

References

External links
 

1966 births
2016 deaths
Boxers from Chicago
Winners of the United States Championship for amateur boxers
National Golden Gloves champions
Heavyweight boxers
Cruiserweight boxers
American male boxers
African-American boxers
Competitors at the 1990 Goodwill Games
Goodwill Games medalists in boxing
20th-century African-American sportspeople
21st-century African-American people